The 2012–13 season was Partick Thistle's seventh consecutive season in the Scottish First Division, having been promoted from the Scottish Second Division at the end of the 2005–06 season. Partick Thistle also competed in the Challenge Cup, League Cup and the Scottish Cup.

Summary

Season
Partick Thistle finished first in the Scottish First Division, and were promoted to the Scottish Premier League. They reached the final of the Challenge Cup, losing 6–5 on penalties to Queen of the South, the second round of the League Cup and the fourth round of the Scottish Cup.

Management
Thistle began the season under the management of Jackie McNamara. On 29 January 2013, the club gave permission to Dundee United to speak to McNamara about becoming their new manager. The following day McNamara and his assistant Simon Donnelly resigned, to become the new management team at United. Later the same day the club announced that Alan Archibald and Scott Paterson would take over as the club's interim management team. On 22 March, the duo were given the job on a permanent basis signing a one-year rolling contract.

Results and fixtures

Pre season

Scottish First Division

Scottish Challenge Cup

Scottish League Cup

Scottish Cup

Player statistics

Captains

Squad 
Last updated 4 May 2013

|}

Disciplinary record
Includes all competitive matches.
Last updated 4 May 2013

Awards
Last updated 3 May 2013

Team statistics

League table

Division summary

Transfers

Players in

Players out

Notes

References

Partick Thistle
Partick Thistle F.C. seasons